Babes With Blades is a Chicago-based all-female stage combat theatre company.

History
In 1997 Dawn "Sam" Alden staged four performances billed as Babes With Blades: An Evening of Women Wielding Weapons as a showcase for female stage combatants in the Chicago area.  Thereafter, Babes With Blades was formally incorporated as a theater company whose mission statement read:

"...to expand opportunities for women in the world of stage combat. By exploring theatrical violence as a storytelling tool and as a means to entertain, educate, and enlighten, we challenge traditional expectations, push personal limitations, and celebrate the historical role of the woman warrior and her modern evolution."[1]

Since the late 1990s, the company has worked with other Chicago-based arts organizations to develop resources and promote awareness in the field of women's stage combat.  Two collaborations with Chicago Dramatists resulted in new scripts written for female actor-combatants, and Babes With Blades' own playwriting initiatives (Joining Sword and Pen and New Plays Development Program) continue to generate new works focused on female characters in strong, complex dramatic and comedic roles.  In addition to theatrical productions, the company's promotional and educational projects include stage combat and acting workshops, appearances at festivals and in the media, newsletters and demonstrations.

Joining Sword and Pen International Playwriting Competition 

The Joining Sword and Pen competition was established in 2005, in an effort to promote the writing of scripts and the production of plays with physical stage combat roles for women.

The inaugural theme was proposed by Society of American Fight Directors Fight Master David Woolley, inspired by Emile Bayard’s painting entitled An Affair of Honor, depicting a duel between two women on a secluded country road.

Since inception, the competition has been held bi-annually, with the winning play receiving the Margaret Martin Award and being produced as part of the company's theatrical season. All entries are inspired by  particular works of art chosen for the competition, and must have women in most or all of the primary roles, and featured in most or all of the combat.

Joining Sword and Pen Playwriting Competition winners

 2020/2021: Jillian Leff for The Gatekeepers
 2019/2020: Catherine McKay for Plaid as Hell
 2017/2018: Arthur M. Jolly for The Lady Demands Satisfaction 
 2015/2016: Dustin Spence for The Promise of a Rose Garden
 2013/2014: Jeff Goode for Witch Slap
 2011/2012: Arthur M. Jolly for Trash
 2009/2010: Arthur M. Jolly for A Gulag Mouse
 2007/2008: Barbara Lhota for Los Desaparecidos
 2005/2006: Byron Hatfield for Mrs. Dire's House of Crumpets and Solutions and Tony Wolf for Satisfaction

Notable alumni
Brooke Elliott

References

External links 
Babes With Blades Website

Theatre companies in Chicago